DWLC is a callsign of three broadcast stations, all in the Philippines:
 DWLC-AM an AM radio station in Lucena City
 DWLC-TV a Studio 23 station in Laoag City, Ilocos Norte
 DWLC-TV (GMA) a GMA Network station in Lucena City